The 1890 Wisconsin gubernatorial election was held on November 4, 1890.

Incumbent Republican Governor William D. Hoard was defeated by Democratic nominee George Wilbur Peck.

Peck became the first Democratic Governor of Wisconsin since William Robert Taylor in 1876.

General election

Candidates
Major party candidates
George Wilbur Peck, Democratic, incumbent Mayor of Milwaukee
William D. Hoard, Republican, incumbent Governor

Other candidates
Charles Alexander, Prohibition, Prohibition nominee for Wisconsin's 8th congressional district in 1888
Reuben May, Union Labor, Greenback nominee for Governor of Wisconsin in 1879

Results

References

Bibliography
 
 
 

1890
Wisconsin
Gubernatorial